Anne Briar Smith  (née Riddall, 13 August 1940 – 22 May 2016) was a New Zealand professor at the University of Otago, and was a pioneering children's rights researcher.

Early life and education 
Smith was born on 13 August 1940 in Porthcawl, Wales, to Dora and Geoff Riddall. Her father worked for the Iraq Petroleum Company, and when that necessitated the family move to Syria, Smith boarded at the Welsh Girls' School in England, aged nine. The family moved to New Zealand in 1954, and Smith attended Te Aroha College, where she was dux in both 1956 and 1957.

Academic career 

Smith completed a BHSc in Home Science at the University of Otago in 1963, and then completed a BA in Education at both Otago and Auckland Universities in 1965. She then undertook an MEd at the University of Alberta in 1969, and then completed a PhD titled Verbalization and selective attention in discrimination shift problems there in 1971. She was supported during her PhD by a Commonwealth Scholarship and an Izaack Walton Killam Memorial Fellowship. After Smith finished her PhD, she and her husband spent two years working for an experimental tertiary education institution in Halifax, Nova Scotia.

In 1974, Smith was appointed as a lecturer in education and human development at the University of Otago. By this time she had two young girls, making her research on quality early childhood education especially relevant. She was instrumental in getting the Dunedin Community Childcare Association established. She also made four films, including Blue for a Girl, about gender stereotyping.

Smith became the inaugural director of the Children's Issues Centre at the University of Otago in 1995. Her work focused in ways to improve children's lives, especially in times of stress such as when parents divorce. She worked to ban physical punishment of children.

Her book Understanding Children's Development was first published in 1982, became a standard text, and is in its fifth edition (now titled Understanding children and childhood).

Family 
Smith married Dr John Smith in Edmonton, Canada, in May 1967. They had two daughters. Smith died on 22 May 2016 in Dunedin.

Legacy and honours 
Smith was elected a Fellow of the Royal Society Te Apārangi in 1995, and appointed as a Companion of the New Zealand Order of Merit in the 2007 New Year Honours. Smith was awarded an Honorary Doctorate by the University of Oulu in Finland in 1998. In 2013 Smith was awarded a New Zealand – UK Link Foundation Visiting Professorship, enabling her to give a series of public lectures in London on children’s rights and the links between government policy and research on children’s issues. On the same trip, she spoke to a House of Lords Select Committee and a Welsh Assembly against physical violence towards children.  

After Smith's death her colleagues were inspired to write a book honouring her achievements, entitled Research, policy and advocacy in the early years: Writing inspired by the achievements of Professor Anne Smith. Smith was selected as one of the Royal Society Te Apārangi's 150 women in 150 words in 2017.

Selected works

References

External links 
Four films made by Smith are available on the University of Otago's website

Written interview with Smith about her early life and career

New Zealand women academics
Fellows of the Royal Society of New Zealand
Companions of the New Zealand Order of Merit
Academic staff of the University of Otago
University of Alberta alumni
University of Oulu alumni
Early childhood education in New Zealand